The Sverdrup Basin Magmatic Province is a large igneous province located on Axel Heiberg Island and Ellesmere Island, Nunavut, Canada near the rifted margin of the Arctic Ocean at the end of Alpha Ridge.

With an area of 550,110 km2, the Sverdrup Basin Magmatic Province forms part of the larger High Arctic Large Igneous Province and consists of flood basalts, dikes and sills which form two volcanic formations called the Ellesmere Island Volcanics and Strand Fiord Formation.

The flood basalt lava flows are similar to those of the Columbia River Basalt Group in the U.S. states of Washington, Oregon and Idaho.

See also
Ashton F. Embry
Volcanism of Canada
Volcanism of Northern Canada
List of volcanoes in Canada

References

Igneous, metamorphic and volcanic studies
Flood basalts of the Sverdrup Basin Magmatic Province, Canadian Arctic Islands, Nunavut: an overview

Geologic provinces of Canada
Large igneous provinces
Volcanism of Nunavut
Cretaceous volcanism
Cretaceous Nunavut